Brigadier David Scott Thomson MC (21 November 1924 – 13 October 2013) was an Australian soldier and politician.

Early life and military career
He was born in Sale, Victoria in 1924. He enlisted in the Australian Army in 1942, and graduated from the Royal Military College, Duntroon, being commissioned as an officer in 1943. He saw active service in World War II in the South-West Pacific, took part in the landing at Balikpapan, New Guinea, and served in Japan 1946–48.  He was on active service again in Korea in 1951, where he was awarded the Military Cross. He served in Malaysia and Sarawak during the Malayan Emergency 1965–66. From 1967 to 1970 he was Director of Infantry and Regimental Colonel of the Royal Australian Regiment.

Politics
From 1972 to 1975 he operated a tourism business. He was the National Country Party (later the National Party) member for the House of Representatives seat of Leichhardt, Queensland, from the 1975 election until his defeat by John Gayler at the 1983 election. He was Minister for Science and the Environment from December 1979 until November 1980 and then Minister for Science and Technology until the Fraser government's defeat at the 1983 election.

In 1985, David Thomson took part in an oral history interview for the Parliamentary Bicentenary Publications Project recorded by his son, historian Alistair Thomson.

Later life and death
He died in Batemans Bay, New South Wales on 13 October 2013, aged 88.

Notes

1924 births
2013 deaths
Military personnel from Victoria (Australia)
Australian brigadiers
Australian military personnel of the Indonesia–Malaysia confrontation
Australian military personnel of the Korean War
Australian Army personnel of World War II
Australian recipients of the Military Cross
Members of the Australian House of Representatives for Leichhardt
National Party of Australia members of the Parliament of Australia
People from Sale, Victoria
Royal Military College, Duntroon graduates
20th-century Australian politicians
Government ministers of Australia